General elections were held in Denmark on 21 September 1994. The coalition of the Social Democratic Party, the Danish Social Liberal Party and the Centre Democrats led by Poul Nyrup Rasmussen remained in power despite the Christian People's Party, which had been part of the government, failing to cross the 2% threshold and losing all four seats. Voter turnout was 84.3% in Denmark proper, 62.3% in the Faroe Islands and 56.7% in Greenland.

Results
The sole elected independent MP in Denmark proper was Jacob Haugaard, who was associated with the Union of Conscientiously Work-Shy Elements. As of 2021, this is the only time an independent candidate has been elected to parliament under the current constitution.

See also
List of members of the Folketing, 1994–1998

References

Elections in Denmark
Denmark
1994 elections in Denmark
September 1994 events in Europe